Wu Pau-hsien (born February 6, 1980, in Taiwan) is a Taiwanese baseball player who currently plays for Brother Elephants of Chinese Professional Baseball League. He played as short relief pitcher for the Elephants.  In 2009, he admitted to match-fixing and were expelled from the team.

Career statistics

References

External links
 

1980 births
Living people
Brother Elephants players
Baseball players from Kaohsiung